Bogusław Pachelski  (born 10 June 1962 in Płock) is a retired Polish professional footballer who played most of his career with Lech Poznań.

Club career
Pachelski had a brief spell in the Turkish Super Lig with Adanaspor and six seasons in the Ekstraklasa with Lech Poznań.

References

1962 births
Living people
Polish footballers
Wisła Płock players
Lech Poznań players
Adanaspor footballers
Canet Roussillon FC players
Expatriate footballers in Turkey
Sportspeople from Płock
Association football forwards